Littorophiloscia vittata is a species of woodlouse in the family Philosciidae. It is native to the east coast of North America, generally under boards and other debris in saltmarshes.

References

Isopoda
Articles created by Qbugbot
Crustaceans described in 1818